is a Japanese fantasy light novel series written by Y.A. and illustrated by Fuzichoco. It was serialized online between June 2013 and March 2017 on the user-generated novel publishing website Shōsetsuka ni Narō. It was acquired by Media Factory, who published the first light novel volume in April 2014 under their MF Books imprint.  A manga adaptation with art by Hiroki Kusumoto has been serialized online via Kadokawa Shoten's ComicWalker website since 2015. An anime television series adaptation by Shin-Ei Animation aired from April 2 to June 18, 2020, with an English dubbed Crunchyroll debuted on May 14, 2020.

Plot
Shingo Ichinomiya was once a single company worker until the day he fell asleep and woke up in a magical fantasy world as a little boy named Wendelin von Benno Baumeister, the eighth son of the noble Baumeister family. Due to his family being poor, Wendelin is unlikely to inherit anything from his father as the family's lord, wealth and possessions will go to his eldest brother Kurt while the rest of his brothers leave the succession to find income by other means. He looks through his father's library and finds a magic testing orb that glows with rainbow colors when he activates it, proving he has an ability to use magic. Alfred, a former court wizard turned restless undead, senses his presence and decides to secretly teach Wendelin everything he knows about magic. Thanks to Alfred, Wendelin becomes a skilled swordsman and mage, leading him to become a famous adventurer known throughout the kingdom. Although his talent could bring prosperity to his family, in his situation it only brought disaster.

Characters

Main characters 

 Wendelin von Benno Baumeister is the main protagonist of the series. He was once a salaryman named  until he is transported into a highly aristocratic and polygamic (for the nobles) fantasy world as the eighth son of Artur von Benno Baumeister. Wendelin is at first worried about his well being since he is unlikely to inherit anything from his family as the youngest and 8th son until he discovers he has magic and meets Alfred Reinford, a former court wizard turned undead spirit who teaches him how to use his magic and makes him a skilled mage. As the series progress, he forms an adventurer party with his former classmates and friends and becomes famous not only for his powerful magic but also for finding lost magical ruins and defeating powerful monsters, especially dragons. Eventually, he is rewarded for his accomplishments by the King of Helmut who grants him the rank of Earl (Count in the anime and the web novel, which is the same thing) and his own lands to rule. Wendelin eventually marries five of his female companions and later his former sister-in-law, students and lovers, including Margrave Bleichröder's legitimized daughter.

 Elise Katharina von Hohenheim, is a priestess and one of Wendelin's party members. Nicknamed the "Saint" by the people due to her kindness, healing powers, and is the granddaughter of the Cardinal of the kingdom's church. Her grandfather arranges a political marriage between Elise and Wendelin, hoping to secure an alliance between the upcoming popular noble and the church. Despite their arranged engagement, Elise genuinely falls in love with Wendelin as they both understand the burden of being in the spotlight. She later marries Wendelin as the head wife of their family.

 Erwin von Alnim is a knight and one of Wendelin's party members. A classmate of Wendelin during their days in the academy, Erwin wishes to find fame and fortune for himself rather than rely on his noble family. After Wendelin becomes an Earl, Erwin pledges loyalty to his best friend as his first retainer and personal guard and later becomes engaged to one of his teammates, Haruka Fujibayashi, a citizen of the semi-independent country of the Count of Mizuho in the Holy Roman Empire. 

 
 Louise Yorande Aorelia Oufelbeik is a martial artist and one of Wendelin's party members. Skilled in channeling magic into physical combat, she became an adventurer after her family kicked her out for possessing excessive mana capacity. She fell in love with Wendelin but due to being a commoner, she at first believes she cannot legally marry him but be his mistress instead. She is also in competition with her best friend Iina, who is also in love with Wendelin. However, Wendelin reveals he loves them both and wants them both to be his wives instead. Thanks to the party's fame and service to the kingdom, the King raises Louise to the rank of nobility, allowing her to marry Wendelin as one of his wives.

 
 Iina Suzane Hirenbrant is a spearwoman and one of Wendelin's party members. The daughter of a family of spear practitioners, she became an adventurer after her family forced her to leave after she defeated and humiliated her older brothers in spear combat. She fell in love with Wendelin since they were classmates but due to her family being vassals, she at first believes she cannot legally marry him but be his mistress instead. She is also in competition with her best friend Louise, who is also in love with Wendelin. However, Wendelin reveals he loves them both and would rather make them both his wives instead. Thanks to the party's fame and service to the kingdom, the King raises Iina to the rank of nobility, allowing her to marry Wendelin as one of his wives.

 Wilma Etol von Asgahan is an ax-wielding hunter and one of Wendelin's party members. She was formerly a hunter serving the Asgahan family until the head of the family, Lord Marshall Edgar Asgahan, adopted her as his daughter as part of his plan to protect Wendelin from jealous nobles by presenting her as a possible fiancé. Wilma was born with a rare condition called Hero's Syndrome, which multiplied her metabolism many times over but also constantly channels her mana into physical prowess many times more efficiently compared to other mages. Due to her condition, she became a hunter out of necessity to feed her high metabolism and agrees to her adopted father's plan since Wendelin, a famous monster hunter and rich noble, will allow her to eat various kinds of monster meat and other foods. She later also becomes one of Wendelin's wives.

Supporting characters 

 Alfred Reinford is a former court wizard and Wendelin's master. He was believed to have been killed during a failed campaign to exterminate dangerous monsters in the Enchanted Forest in the Baumeister domain, but was revealed to have survived as a Whispering Dead, a sentient undead doomed to eventually become a mindless zombie. Sensing Wendelin's great potential, he profoundly makes him his disciple and trained him for several weeks, before passing away peacefully. Their time together was short-lived he had the greatest impact on Wendelin's life. After Wendelin turned 12, he took Alfred's advice on how to make intuition in order to get into the adventure academy. Alfred's assets and wealth are later inherited by Wendelin as his successor.

A retired adventurer and around 50 years old, Brantack is Alfred Reinford's former magic teacher and later mentor to Wendelin and his party. He is currently in the employ of Lord Bleichröder.

 The King's court wizard, proficient in physical enhancing magic, and Alfred Reinford's best friend. He later teaches Louise and Wendelein after the noble's tournament and becomes their guru. He is Elise's uncle.

 A former spearman warrior who serves Wendelin as his chamberlain. Roderich tried to get Wendelin to notice hire him as a retainer for years. Roderich comes from a merchant family and has numerous connections with merchants. He is the illegitimate son of the financial auditor, Baron Rückner. After the events with Kurt and the death of Rückner, Rhodrich declined to inherit the peerage from Rückner. He then transferred to the new Baumeister Earldom to become its governor. He acts as Wendelin's advisor. In the web novel, Roderich is referred to as a majordomo.

 Amalie is Kurt's wife, the mother of his two sons, and Wendelin's sister-in-law. After Kurt's death, she begins a relationship with Wendelin and teaches him how to properly make love with his wives before their wedding. Later, both Amalie and Wendelin genuinely fall in love with each other and she becomes his mistress.

 Leader of the kingdom's church and Elise's grandfather. He wanted Wendelin under his influence to increase the church's political power, so he tricked a still young and naïve Wendelin into agreeing to marry Elise, becoming Wendelin's grandfather-in-law.
Amadeus Freytag von Bleichröder

The noble in charge of the southern part of the Kingdom of Helmut, which includes the lands of the Knight of Baumeister. In the anime, he is a Duke. In the web novel, he is a Margrave. His father was the leader of the troops, with Alfred Reinford as his wizard, that perished and became undead, while trying to subdue the Devil Forest.
Katharina
 Katharina Linda von Waigel is a headstrong (former) noble with a competitive streak who has a strong belief in the traditions of the nobility. As such, she has a tendency to be overly concerned with "keeping up appearances" in accordance with her perceived status. At some point prior to meeting Wend, she also became very hostile and provocative towards others, due to her always being singled out by those who wished to take advantage of her. This caused Wend to initially peg her as having a "loner" type personality. She is also easily embarrassed, to the point of stereo-typically crying into Elise's lap when Wend "accidentally" saw her naked, and turning beet-red when she confessed/proposed to him. She also becomes one of Wendelin's wives.
Therese Sigrid von Philip
A candidate for the emperor of the Holy Roman Empire, she is a very stubborn person who is well respected within her own domain after going through various circumstances. She is also quite fond of Earl Baumeister to the point of openly flirting and teasing him in front of his wives. She genuinely ends up in love with Wendelin even though he rebukes her every time.

Baumeister Household 

 Kurt Baumeister is Wendelin's eldest brother and heir to the Baumeister family. He is the least educated of all his brothers and was always worried about one of his brothers stealing his inheritance. Proud and arrogant of being the heir, he grows jealous of his youngest brother after Wendelin's fame as an adventurer grows. Due to his illiteracy, he is forced to rely heavily on his wife Amalie, and Klaus, the village chief. Wanting his brother's riches and assets, he joins a conspiracy with a group of nobles who are also jealous of Wendelin and want him assassinated (unaware Wendelin had submitted a will, and Kurt will get nothing but a bounty on his head). The conspiracy fails as Wendelin made an offer to all of Kurt's accomplices, and was deceived into using a cursed flute to kill Wendelin, which killed Kurt in the process and Wendelin and Elise purified him. In his final moments, an entity that carries a fragment of his malice flies over to slaughter the one who had used him, Baron Rückner.

 The current lord and Wendelin's father who rules small farmland. He has eight sons from his wife Johanna and mistress Leila. His great-grandfather was a prince second-in-line of his household when he explored the territory had it to achieve the development of a portion of the monster-infested lands. He had a dark past towards women as he was known in the village as sleeping with married women and getting them pregnant. All this makes Wendelin unhappy and has a strained relationship with his father. Despite his poor education, Artur knew his eldest son Kurt was not suitable to be the next lord, but cannot bring himself to deny Kurt the position as presumptive heir. When Kurt dies in an ill-fated attempt to assassinate Wendelin, Artur is forced to retire and officially passes the position to his second son Hermann.

Media

Light novels
Hachinan tte, Sore wa Nai Deshō! is written by Y.A. and illustrated by Fuzichoco. The light novels has been published by Media Factory, under their MF Books imprint. Twenty-seven volumes have been released as of December 2022.

Manga
A manga adaptation with art by Hiroki Kusumoto has been published online by Kadokawa Shoten's ComicWalker since 2015. As of May 2022, it has been collected in eleven tankōbon volumes.

Anime
An anime adaptation of the series was announced by Media Factory on December 14, 2018. The anime was later confirmed to be a television series, which aired from April 2 to June 18, 2020 on Tokyo MX, BS11, and AT-X. The series is animated by Shin-Ei Animation, with assistance by SynergySP, and is directed by Tatsuo Miura, featuring series composition by Takeshi Miyamoto and character designs by Keiji Tanabe. Minako Sato is composing the series' music. The opening theme is  performed by Demon Kakka and Arika Takarano, while the ending theme is  performed by Akino Arai x AKINO from Bless4. The series' English dub premiered on Crunchyroll on May 14, 2020.

Notes

References

External links
  at Shōsetsuka ni Narō 
  
  
 

2014 Japanese novels
Anime and manga based on light novels
Isekai anime and manga
Isekai novels and light novels
Japanese webcomics
Kadokawa Shoten manga
Kadokawa Dwango franchises
Light novels
Light novels first published online
Seinen manga
Shin-Ei Animation
Shōsetsuka ni Narō
Webcomics in print